The 1973–74 season was Sport Lisboa e Benfica's 70th season in existence and the club's 40th consecutive season in the top flight of Portuguese football, covering the period from 1 July 1973 to 30 June 1974. Benfica competed domestically in the Primeira Divisão and the Taça de Portugal, and participated in the European Cup after winning the previous league.

After dominating the league the year before, Jimmy Hagan started his fourth season at Benfica. With only 
Mário Moinhos and António Barros as new additions, Benfica started their campaign on 9 September, losing in the opening day to Boavista. Two weeks later, Hagan unexpectedly resigned from his position because of interference of President Borges Coutinho to his job. Assistant Fernando Cabrita replaced him and within a month, Benfica was knocked-out of the European Cup by Újpesti Dózsa. Despite that, Benfica's performance in the Primeira Divisão remained good, with the team getting a point from the top on early December. However a poor end of the month saw them lost the undefeated streak at home dating back to 1965, and fall to fourth place, four points from the top. In the second half of the season, Benfica collected consecutive wins and reached second place by early February, while also cutting their gap to Sporting to just one point. In March, a loss in Estádio das Antas with Porto and a draw with Beira-Mar, put Sporting with a four-point lead again. Nonetheless, Benfica beat Sporting at their own home and three weeks later, they got back to a single point difference after their rival dropped points. That gap remained unchanged until the last match-day, when Sporting won the title. In the Portuguese Cup, Benfica reached the Taça de Portugal Final after beating Porto away, but lost the competition on extra-time to Sporting.

Season summary
Benfica started the new season after having won their third consecutive league title in the past season. It was their first league undefeated, and they also broke a record for longest distance to second place, 18 points. In the transfer window, Benfica signed Mário Moinhos and brought back António Barros from loan. In the departures, they let go of Augusto Matine and João Alves. In his fourth year, Hagan's pre-season saw Benfica play in Angola and Mozambique, three games with América with three different results. Afterwards, they played the Trofeo Colombino in 18 and 19 August, losing the trophy for Dinamo Tbilisi. From 21 to 23 August, Benfica participated in the inaugural Trofeo Villa de Madrid, finishing fourth. The pre-season closed with the Thessaloniki Tournament, which Benfica won.

Benfica started their title defence on 9 September against Boavista on Estádio do Bessa. They lost 2–0, ending their undefeated streak in the competition that dated back to 26 March 1972. The team responded well and won their next three league matches. On 25 September, on a day of Eusébio testimonial match, in a training session, Humberto Coelho, Toni and Nelinho did an exercise wrong and Jimmy Hagan lost it. He fined them, made them repeat an afternoon practise and miss the game. Hagan back-tracked on the first two, but still did not call them for the game saying that "Toni and Humberto will not play". President Borges Coutinho overruled him and Hagan unexpectedly resigned the next day for interference to his job. He was replaced by Fernando Cabrita, his assistant. His first game was an away win against Olympiacos for the European Cup. On 7 October, Benfica drew 0–0 with Farense, adding another lost point in the campaign. In the league table, they sat in third place with 7 points, two shy of leaders Vitória de Setúbal. But as Benfica resumed their winning path domestically, in the European Cup, the situation deteriorated, with Benfica being knocked-out by Újpesti Dózsa in the second round. Now solely focused in the Primeira Divisão, on match-day 9, Benfica dropped points on the road again, drawing 0–0 with Vitória de Guimarães. That allowed Vitória de Setúbal to increase their lead even further. On 2 December, Benfica defeated Sporting in the Derby de Lisboa to overtake them in the league. They also took advantage of the loss of Setúbal to reduce their lead to a point. However, the following week, on the first away match of December, Benfica lost 2–0 against Académica de Coimbra and was again three points down from leaders Setúbal. The month closed with a home defeat against Vitória de Setúbal, their first home loss since 17 October 1965. Losing by 3–2 in Estádio da Luz pushed Benfica into fourth place with 21 points, four less than Sporting, who lapped the first half of the season in first place.

Benfica's first games in 1974 was much better overall. After winning all their matches in January, Benfica reached second-place ex-aequo with Porto on 11 February. Taking advantage of Porto's draw and Sporting's loss, Benfica won their match and cut Sporting's lead to just one point. In early March, Benfica surpassed Porto after their rival dropped points in Guimarães. On 10 March, Benfica visited Estádio das Antas to play Porto, losing 2–1. With this defeat, Benfica was now with 35 points, three less than Sporting. Following a home win against Guimarães, on next match on the road, Benfica drew with Beira-Mar by 1–1. The draw allowed Sporting to open a four-point gap with five matches to go, practically ending any hope of Benfica renewing their league title. On 31 March, Benfica  played Sporting in Estádio de Alvalade and defeated them by 5–3,  cutting their rivals lead to two points. Before the match, Sporting had requested a Spanish referee and issued an announcement asking for doping control on Benfica. Fernando Cabrita replied that Benfica's players did not need to be drugged to be the best in Portugal, as they had shown in the match and with eight points in play, Benfica was not dead yet. On 21 April, Sporting dropped points with Beira-Mar, and witnessed Benfica get within a point with three matches to go. Four days later, Carnation Revolution occurred, bringing the country back to democracy. In May, in the last three matches with both teams separated by a point, Sporting won the title on 20 May after defeating Barreirense, while Benfica drew with Setúbal. Benfica finished with two points less, 47 to 49. On 2 June, Benfica secured their presence in the Taça de Portugal Final after a 3–0 win against Porto on Estádio das Antas. Seven days later, Benfica met Sporting in the Final. A goal from Nené gave Benfica the lead which lasted until the 88th minute, when Sporting levelled. In extra-time, Marinho scored for Sporting which awarded them a double. It was Fernando Cabrita last match in charge, as he already knew he was being replaced with Milorad Pavić.

Competitions

Overall record

Primeira Divisão

League table

Results by round

Matches

Taça de Portugal

European Cup

First round

Second round

Friendlies

Player statistics
The squad for the season consisted of the players listed in the tables below, as well as staff member Jimmy Hagan (manager), Fernando Cabrita (assistant manager and later as manager).

Transfers

In

Out

Out by loan

References

Bibliography

S.L. Benfica seasons
Benfica